Washington King (October 5, 1815 – August 27, 1861) was the 15th mayor of St. Louis, Missouri, serving from 1855 to 1856.

Mayor King was a passenger on the Pacific Railroad excursion train that crashed through the temporary bridge over the Gasconade River on November 1, 1855.  He was badly cut in the accident.   Subsequently he declared a day of mourning for the victims.

He is buried in Bellefontaine Cemetery in St. Louis.

References

External links 
 Washington King at the St. Louis Public Library: St. Louis Mayors website.

1815 births
1861 deaths
Mayors of St. Louis
Missouri Know Nothings